"You Don't Mess Around with Jim" is a 1972 strophic (all verses have the same tune) story song by Jim Croce from his album of the same name. It was Croce's debut single, released on ABC Records as ABC-11328. ABC Records promotion man Marty Kupps took it to KHJ 930 AM in Los Angeles, CA where it first aired. It made the KHJ "30" chart (at #27) that week of June 6, 1972. After spending 11 weeks on the Billboard Hot 100 chart, the song peaked at No. 8 the week ending September 9. Croce performed the song on American Bandstand on August 12, 1972. Billboard ranked it as the No. 68 song for 1972.

Content
The lyrics are set around an underground pool hall on 42nd Street in New York City. "Big" Jim Walker, a pool hustler who is not too bright but is respected because of his tough reputation, his considerable strength and size, and his skill at pool, has formed a sort of gang of "bad folks" who regularly gather at night in the pool hall. Their recurring words of advice is as follows:

You don't tug on Superman's cape
You don't spit into the wind
You don't pull the mask off the old Lone Ranger
And you don't mess around with Jim

A fellow pool player named Willie "Slim" McCoy comes from south Alabama to the pool hall to get his money back from Jim after being hustled out of it the previous week. When Jim comes in, McCoy ambushes and kills him, stabbing him in "about a hundred places" (to the point where "the only part that wasn't bloody was the soles of the big man's feet") and shooting him "in a couple more". It is implied that McCoy now has his money back as well as the respect formerly granted to Jim, and the regulars at the pool hall have now changed their advice to strangers: "You don't mess around with Slim".

The song is noted for its spoken recitation, which is heard following the third verse and chorus:
Yeah, Big Jim got his hat
Find out where it's at
And it's not hustlin' people strange to you
Even if you do got a two-piece custom-made pool cue
This is followed by the repeat of the Chorus and the repeated Coda before the song's fade.

Croce tells a similar story— a much-feared tough guy who gets his comeuppance from someone even tougher— in his later hit single "Bad, Bad Leroy Brown".

Reception
Cash Box described it as being "perfectly polished and honed for super Top 40/ MOR/ FM impact" despite being Croce's first single.

Live performances
Live versions of the song have been released on both of Croce's live albums, Have You Heard: Jim Croce Live and Jim Croce Live: The Final Tour.

Track listing
7" single (ABC-11328)
 "You Don't Mess Around with Jim" – 3:00
 "Photographs and Memories" – 2:03

Chart performance

Weekly charts

Year-end charts

Poison Cover 
American glam metal band Poison covered the song (under the name ''Don't Mess Around With Jim (demo)''). It is included as a bonus track on the 2006 remaster of their 1986 debut album Look What the Cat Dragged In. It is the 13th track on the album.

Josh Turner Cover
Josh Turner covered "You Don't Mess Around with Jim" on his 2003 debut album ''Long Black Train.

See also
 Billboard Year-End Hot 100 singles of 1972

References

1971 songs
1972 debut singles
Jim Croce songs
Songs written by Jim Croce
ABC Records singles
Songs about fictional male characters
Songs about New York City